Love Lies Bleeding is a detective novel by Edmund Crispin, first published in 1948. Set in the post-war period in and around a public school in the vicinity of Stratford-upon-Avon, it is about the accidental discovery of old manuscripts which contain Shakespeare's long-lost play, Love's Labour's Won, and the subsequent hunt for those manuscripts, in the course of which several people are murdered. Collaborating with the local police, Oxford don Gervase Fen, a Professor of English who happens to be the guest of honour at the school's Speech Day, can solve the case at the same weekend.

See also
 School and university in literature

References

Barry Forshaw: The Rough Guide to Crime Fiction (London, 2007) 24f., where Love Lies Bleeding is mentioned as a prime example of the Golden Age of Detective Fiction ("generally felt to be a key outing for the detective [...] handled in prose of quiet and unspectacular skill, with a brilliantly created cloistered world at its centre").

Bibliography
 Reilly, John M. Twentieth Century Crime & Mystery Writers. Springer, 2015.
 Whittle, David. Bruce Montgomery/Edmund Crispin: A Life in Music and Books. Routledge, 2017.

External links
Love Lies Bleeding at the Golden Age of Detection Wiki

1948 British novels
British detective novels
British mystery novels
Novels by Edmund Crispin
Novels set in Warwickshire
J. B. Lippincott & Co. books
Campus novels
Victor Gollancz Ltd books